Vasilić is a Serbian surname. Notable people with the surname include:

Jovica Vasilić (born 1990), Serbian footballer
Velibor Vasilić (born 1980), Bosnia and Herzegovina footballer

See also
Vasilijević, surname
Vasiljević, surname
Vasić, surname

Serbian surnames